Ampatuyoc (possibly from Quechua hamp'atu frog, -yuq a suffix to indicate ownership, "the one with a frog (or frogs)") is a mountain in the Andes of Peru, about  high. It is located in the Ayacucho Region, Víctor Fajardo Province, Sarhua District.

References

Mountains of Peru
Mountains of Ayacucho Region